Sunburn is a British television series that followed the lives of a group of British holiday reps. It was broadcast on BBC One between 16 January 1999 and 1 May 2000, running for two series of six and eight episodes respectively. The first was set and filmed in Cyprus and the second in Algarve. The cast included Michelle Collins, Rebecca Callard, Sharon Small, George Layton and Sean Maguire, with Paul Nicholas joining later. The series was created by Mike Bullen, who was interested in the behind-the-scenes lives of holiday reps after watching the docusoap Holiday Reps. Bullen wrote most of the first series but scaled back his involvement in the second; most of that series' episodes were written by Lizzie Mickery.

The series has never been officially released on video or DVD, nor in any digital format.

Episodes

Series one (1999)
Episode one (16 January 1999) – Nicki Matthews arrives to take over as Janus Holidays' head rep.
Episode two (23 January 1999) – Laura has to look after a family of appalling holidaymakers, while Carol conspires to reunite Nicki with Yiannis.
Episode three (30 January 1999) – Carol agrees to organise a small wedding for two holiday-makers.
Episode four (6 February 1999) – Yiannis's wife puts Nicki in an awkward spot. Julie's parents arrive.
Episode five (13 February 1999) – Alan gets into trouble with the police.
Episode six (20 February 1999) – Nicki must choose between Yiannis and Steve. Will Greg and Maria ever be reconciled?

Series two (2000)
A Tale of Kidnap and Celebrity (22 January 2000) – Nicki and her team are still finding their feet in their new resort when Alan is mistakenly kidnapped by a political group.
New Opportunities, Second Chances and Dominoes (29 January 2000) – A domino competition keeps the reps busy, while Nicki gets an offer she may not be able to refuse.
Children and Growing Up (5 February 2000) – David and Nicki swap places for a week to prove how easy the other's job is.
Unexpected Love and Golf (12 February 2000) – A golf tournament adds to the reps' workload, while Carol discovers a magical passion.
Episode five (19 February 2000) – Is a holiday-maker's romance with a playboy all it seems? Nicki and the Janus reps investigate.
Episode six (26 February 2000) – Two teenagers fall in love while the Janus team are kept busy organising a medieval banquet.
Episode seven (4 March 2000) – Carol is pursued by a love-struck holidaymaker, while Greg's antics turn his love-life into a dangerous farce.
Episode eight (11 March 2000) – The end of season party leads to some unexpected repercussions, and Janus Holidays finds itself at the mercy of a saboteur.

Cast

{| class="wikitable plainrowheaders" style="text-align:center"
! scope="col" rowspan="2" style="width:15%;" | Character
! scope="col" rowspan="2" style="width:15%;" | Portrayed by
! scope="col" colspan="2" style="width:60%;" | Seasons
|-
! scope="col" style="width:5%;" | 1
! scope="col" style="width:5%;" | 2
|-
| scope="row" | Niki Matthews
| Michelle Collins
| colspan="2" 
|-
| scope="row" | Laura Hutchings
| Rebecca Callard
| colspan="2" 
|-
| scope="row" | Carol Simpson
| Sharon Small
| colspan="2" 
|-
| nowrap | Greg Patterson
| James Buller
| colspan="2" 
|-
| scope="row" |  Alan Brookes 
| George Layton
| colspan="2" 
|-
| scope="row" | Lee Wilson
| Sean Maguire
| colspan="1" 
| colspan="1" 
|-
| scope="row" |  Julie Hill
| Colette Brown
| colspan="1" 
| colspan="1" 
|-
| scope="row" |  David Janus
| Paul Nicholas
| colspan="1" 
| colspan="1" 
|-
| scope="row" | Yiannis Kyprianou
| Peter Polycarpou
| colspan="1" 
| colspan="1" 
|-
| scope="row" | Maria Ioannides
| Natalie J. Robb
| colspan="1" 
| colspan="1" 
|-
| scope="row" | Tassos Ioannides
| George Zenios
| colspan="1" 
| colspan="1" 
|-
| scope="row" | Elena Kyprianou
| Zeta Graff
| colspan="1" 
| colspan="1" 
|}

Guest appearances

Over the course of the two series many well known celebrities appeared including Isla Fisher, Josephine Tewson, James D'Arcy, Robin Askwith, Maxine Peake, Colin Baker, Windsor Davies, Cliff Parisi and John Pickard.

Music
The theme song was sung by Collins and was released on cassette and CD in 1999

References

External links

1990s British drama television series
2000s British drama television series
1999 British television series debuts
2000 British television series endings
BBC Television shows
BBC television dramas
English-language television shows
Television shows set in Cyprus
Films shot in the Algarve